The 2011–12 La Salle Explorers basketball team represented La Salle University during the 2011–12 NCAA Division I men's basketball season. The Explorers, led by eighth year head coach John Giannini, played their home games at Tom Gola Arena and are members of the Atlantic 10 Conference. They finished the season 21–13, 9–7 in A-10 to finish in a four-way tie for fifth place. They lost in the quarterfinals of the A-10 Basketball tournament to Saint Louis. They were invited to the 2012 National Invitation Tournament where they lost in the first round to Minnesota.

Roster

Schedule

|-
!colspan=9 style=| Exhibition

|-
!colspan=9 style=| Regular season

|-
!colspan=9 style=| Atlantic 10 tournament

|-
!colspan=9 style=| NIT

References

La Salle Explorers men's basketball seasons
La Salle
La Salle
La Salle
La